Roger Owen (13 December 1953 – 20 July 2021) was a Welsh rugby union, and professional rugby league footballer who played in the 1970s and 1980s.

Owen joined Llanelli RFC and played 24 matches before joining New Dock Stars - a junior club in Llanelli. In 1980 after turning down an offer to change codes and join Hull F.C., Owen did accept an offer to change codes and joined St Helens in August 1980, making his first team debut against Castleford on 26 October 1980.  A further 44 appearances, in which he scored four tries, followed before he was placed on the transfer list in October 1982. Declining to move to Cardiff Blue Dragons, Owen retired from the game and returned to Llanelli where he worked for a tunnelling company.

During his time at St Helens, Owen played twice for the Welsh national team, making two appearances as a substitute in 1981; against  in January and against  in November.

Owen is number 947 on the St Helens heritage list and number 326 on the Wales national team heritage list.

References

1953 births
2021 deaths
Footballers who switched code
New Dock Stars RFC players
Rugby league players from Llanelli
Rugby league props
Rugby union players from Llanelli
Rugby union props
St Helens R.F.C. players
Wales national rugby league team players
Welsh rugby league players
Welsh rugby union players